Katy Victoria J Wix (born 28 February 1980) is a Welsh actress, writer, author and artist.  She is best known for her television roles as Carole in Stath Lets Flats, Mary in Ghosts and Jules in Big Boys. She has also appeared as a series contestant on Taskmaster and as a recurring character in the science fiction mini-series Torchwood: Children of Earth in 2009. She has written two series of her own sitcom for BBC Radio 4, Bird Island and a sketch show for Channel 4, Anna & Katy. In 2017 her painting was chosen for the Royal Academy of Arts Summer Exhibition. She has written two books of monologues and in 2021 she published her first work of non-fiction, Delicacy.

Early life
Wix was born in Pontypridd and raised in Peterston-super-Ely, near Cardiff. Her mother and father both went to drama school and worked as actors before transitioning into careers in, respectively, arts administration and stage management. Her brother is a musician. She attended the University of Warwick in Coventry before going on to the Royal Welsh College of Music & Drama.

Career
While studying at the Royal Welsh College of Music & Drama, Wix entered the Funny Women competition. She met comedian Anna Crilly in the competition and they later performed as a double act. 

In 2007, Wix joined the cast of sitcom Not Going Out as recurring character Daisy and then went on to be a regular from Series 3 until her final appearance in the 2015 Christmas special. In Torchwood: Children of Earth she plays Rhiannon Davies, the sister of Ianto Jones. In 2010, she presented the BBC Three series The King Is Dead. She made guest appearances on the BBC shows Horrible Histories, Outnumbered (2010) and Absolutely Fabulous (2011). 

She played Phoebe in Tom Basden's stage comedy Party and its subsequent three series spin-off on BBC Radio 4 also called Party. Wix wrote and co-starred in the same station's comedy series Bird Island, which also featured Reece Shearsmith, Julian Rhind-Tutt and Alison Steadman.

In 2017, for the BBC, she portrayed Nurse Cornish in an episode of the TV crime drama Sherlock, and Florence Fagin in the TV dramatisation of Decline and Fall. She also featured in the radio series Ankle Tag (BBC Radio 4) and The Accidental AM (BBC Radio Wales). She also played Mary, one of the main characters, in the 2019 BBC One sitcom Ghosts.

In 2021 she published Delicacy: a memoir of cake and death, a feminist memoir in which she recounts 21 life-defining moments to do with loss, body image, recovery from eating disorder and love.

Personal life
Wix has been diagnosed with autism.

At age 26, Wix was involved in a serious car accident, which has affected her health ever since.

Filmography

Film

Television

Radio

References

External links
 

1980 births
Living people
People from Pontypridd
Alumni of the University of Warwick
Welsh film actresses
British film actresses
British television actresses
Welsh radio actresses
Welsh television actresses
Welsh women comedians
21st-century Welsh actresses
Actors with autism
Artists with autism
British women memoirists
Welsh memoirists